Frank Prescott may refer to:
 Frank Prescott (footballer), English footballer
 Frank C. Prescott, member of the California State Assembly
 Frank L. Prescott, member of the Wisconsin State Assembly